Splash Corporation is a Filipino personal care company based in Bonifacio Global City, Taguig. It is a subsidiary of Wipro Enterprises.

Brands

Current brands
 Flawlessly U (formerly Extract)
 Hygienix
 Kolours
 Maxi-Peel
 Shades by Kolours
 SkinWhite
 Stylex (formerly Control)
 Vitress
 Extraderm
 Extract

Former brands
 Baby Spa
 Biolink
 Extract VCO
 Hiyas
 TheraHerb
 Tricks
 VCO Manila

References 

Cosmetics companies of the Philippines
Personal care companies
Companies based in Bonifacio Global City
Chemical companies established in 1985
1985 establishments in the Philippines
Philippine subsidiaries of foreign companies